William Groves may refer to:

William Groves (educator) (1898–1967), Australian educator and public servant
William F. Groves (1893–1963), American politician and farmer
Willie Groves (1868–1908), Scottish international footballer

See also
William Graves (disambiguation)
William Grove (disambiguation)
Williams Grove (disambiguation)